AstroMenace is a 3D scrolling shooter, developed and published by Russian independent game developer Viewizard.

Gameplay 

The game features 13 levels, within which, money and experience points are earned by destroying enemy aliens, pirates, or meteorites. Using this money, the player can purchase from a selection of 22 ship types, 19 weapons, and 20 ship upgrades.

Development
The Windows version was offered for $14.95 as Shareware early access title, having a free downloadable test version. However, a Linux version was offered as donationware.

After full release in February 2007, Viewizard sold the Windows version directly from their website for $19.95.

In October 2007, version v1.2 of the game's C++ source code was released as free and open-source software under GPLv3. A fork called  was started at SourceForge.net. Some years later, Viewizard moved its own development to this fork by unifying both branches and making it the official version. Ports for other platforms were later developed, with Mac OS X and OpenPandora versions being released. In 2016 the game's content was re-released under an open content CC BY-SA 4.0 Creative Commons license. In April 2018 some artwork with sources (.3ds render files) were released under the GPLv3 in their own repository. Development continues on GitHub (as of November 2022).

Reception
In December 2007 the UK magazine Linux Format rated  with 8/10 credits. In 2008 a Full Circle magazine review named  among a list of "Top 5 space games". In 2011 Unixmen.com placed  as number one in their  list. Linux For You September 2009 ranked  4/5.

See also

 List of open source games

References

External links

 

2007 video games
Linux games
Windows games
MacOS games
Open-source video games
Scrolling shooters
Commercial video games with freely available source code
Creative Commons-licensed video games
Indie video games
Freeware games
Video games developed in Russia
Formerly proprietary software